Daisy Margaret Soros (née Schlenger; September 7, 1929) is an American philanthropist and supporter of the arts. She is the chairperson of the Paul & Daisy Soros Fellowship for New Americans, a fellowship program that supports two years of graduate studies for 30 new Americans each year. She was married to the late Paul Soros, founder of Soros Associates and older brother of financier George Soros.

Early life and education

Daisy Margaret Schlenger was born in Bratislava (in modern-day Slovakia) on September 7, 1929, but was raised in Austria and Hungary. 

Her parents were Paul (in Hungarian Pál) Schlenger and Piroska Erzsebet "Piri" Schlenger (née Stein).     

After graduating from the Lutheran Gymnasium, she received her diploma from École hôtelière de Lausanne in Switzerland. She came to the United States on a student visa as a Hungarian citizen, enrolling at Columbia University School of General Studies. 

She later attended the New York School of Interior Design, and NYU’s School of Social Work, and worked extensively as a counselor to terminally ill patients and their families.

Paul Soros and Daisy Schlenger met in 1950 in New York, where they were both college students living at the International House. They began dating, and married in 1951. They had four children, Peter, Steven Paul, Linda and Jeffrey. Both Peter and Jeffrey serve on the Board of the Paul and Daisy Soros Fellowship Program, Jeffrey as its President. Steven Paul and Linda died in separate accidents in early childhood.

Philanthropy 

Soros has been involved with various charitable organizations for decades. In 1993, she became a member of the Board of Overseers of Weill Cornell Medical College. In an effort to promote the mission and ideals of academic medicine, she founded the Information Please luncheon lecture series which continues.  She served on the Board of Overseers for the  Discoveries that Make a Difference Campaign which raised $1.3 billion for the Weill Cornell Medical School and is founder of the Dean’s Council.

In 1997, Paul and Daisy Soros established the Paul and Daisy Soros Fellowship for New Americans in order to provide assistance to young new Americans for graduate studies. Initially with a fifty million dollar trust fund, the Soroses donated an additional $25 million in 2010 and have supported over 700 grantees to date. 

Soros serves on the boards of The Society of the Memorial Sloan-Kettering Cancer Center, The Foreign Policy Association and The American Austrian Foundation. She is an honorary trustee of the International House.

Involvement in the arts

Daisy Soros serves as secretary on the board of the New York Philharmonic and the Metropolitan Opera, director emeritus of the Lincoln Center for the Performing Arts, the chairman’s council of the Metropolitan Museum of Art, Vice President of Venetian Heritage, and is former Chairman of the Board of the Friends of the Budapest Festival Orchestra.

Awards and honors

Soros has received several awards and honors for her philanthropic work, including:

The Metro International Fulbright Award,
The Lincoln Center Laureate Award,
The Ellis Island Medal of Honor,
The International House Harry Edmonds Award,
The Casita Maria Gold Medal of Honor, 
The National Immigration Forum's "Keepers of the American Dream Award," 
Honors from the Henry Street Settlement,
An "honorary" Doctor of Laws at Bates College in Maine, 
An "honorary" Doctor of Humane Letter from Macaulay Honors College of the City University of New York, and
An "honorary" Doctor of Arts from the New York School of Interior Design.

References

Living people
American people of Hungarian-Jewish descent
New York University alumni
American philanthropists
Hungarian Jews
Hungarian philanthropists
Jewish American philanthropists
Daisy
1929 births